is a　multipurpose indoor sporting arena located in Hamamatsu, Shizuoka, Japan. It is a 15-minute walk from Tenryūgawa Station on the Tōkaidō Main Line railway, or a 10-minute drive from the Hamamatsu Interchange on the Tōmei Expressway.

With a capacity for seating 8,000 spectators, Hamamatsu Arena was opened in 1990. It has been used for numerous music concerts and sporting events, notably the Group C games for the 2006 FIBA World Championship. Hamamatsu Arena was the home stadium for the Hamamatsu Higashimikawa Phoenix bj league professional basketball team. Further, it was one of the host arenas for the official 2010 Women's Volleyball World Championship.

External links
 Hamamatsu Arena
Hamamatsu Arena

Indoor arenas in Japan
Basketball venues in Japan
Buildings and structures in Hamamatsu
San-en NeoPhoenix
Sports venues in Shizuoka Prefecture
Sports venues completed in 1990
1990 establishments in Japan